JLo Ann Varada Vázquez (born 2 February 2003) is a Puerto Rican footballer who plays as a goalkeeper for the Puerto Rico women's national team.

Early life

Born in San Juan, Varada attended Escuela Rafael Hernández Marín and later Colegio María Reina. In 2018, she was invited to join the IMG Academy's soccer program and moved to Bradenton, Florida.

International career

In May 2018, Varada made her senior debut for the Puerto Rican women's national football team in a 5–0 2018 CONCACAF Women's Championship qualifier victory against Aruba. Later the same year, she played in two friendlies against Argentina on August 30th and September 2nd.

In 2021, Varada appeared in friendlies against the Dominican Republic and Uruguay.

References

2003 births
Living people
Women's association football goalkeepers
Puerto Rican women's footballers
Puerto Rico women's international footballers
Florida Gators women's soccer players